Mjällby Allmänna Idrottsförening, also known simply as Mjällby AIF, Mjällby or (especially locally) MAIF, is a Swedish professional football club based in Hällevik. The club is affiliated to Blekinge Fotbollförbund and play its home games at Strandvallen. The club colours, reflected in their crest and kit, are yellow and black. Formed on 1 April 1939, the club have played eight seasons in Sweden's highest football league Allsvenskan, the club's first season in the league was in 1980. The club are currently playing  in Allsvenskan (top division). With nine seasons in the top division Allsvenskan, Mjällby AIF is the most successful football team from the province of Blekinge.

Former Sweden national football team players Christian Wilhelmsson and Mattias Asper began their careers at the club. 
Both players also ended their playing careers in Mjällby.

Players

First-team squad

Managers

 Johnny Ringerg (1954–56)
 Sven-Olle Malmberg (1956–58)
 John Nilsson (1959)
 Gösta Färm (1960–61)
 Elon Nilsson (1962)
 Folke Jönsson (1963)
 Arne Lindskog (1964)
 Bror Sjöholm (1965–66)
 Kjell Larsson (1967)
 Gösta Färm (1968)
 Adolf Vogel (1969–70)
 Arne Svensson (1971–74)
 Jan-Ove Jansson (1975–78)
 Bo Nilsson (1979–80)
 Håkan Håkansson (1981)
 Göran Bogren (1982–84)
 Anders Linderoth (1985–89)
 Ingvar Johansson (1990)
 Peter Antoine (Jan 1, 1991 – June 30, 1993)
 Jan Mattsson (1993)
 Peter Antoine (1994–96)
 Sergei Prigoda (1997–98)
 Hans Larsson (1999–02)
 Sören Cratz (2003–05)
 Thomas Andersson-Borstam (2005 – Dec 31, 2008)
 Peter Swärdh (Jan 1, 2009 – Dec 31, 2012)
 Anders Torstensson (Jan 1, 2013 – Oct 16, 2013)
 Lars Jacobsson (Oct 16, 2013–14)
 Anders Linderoth (July 21, 2014– May 18, 2015)
 Hasse Larsson (May 19, 2015– Dec 31, 2015)
 Patrik Rosengren (Jan 1, 2016– Aug 31, 2016)
 Mattias Asper (Aug 31, 2016– Sep 5, 2016)
 Jonas Andersson (Sep 5, 2016– Jun 18, 2018)
  Miloš Milojević (Jun 19, 2018– Dec 1, 2019)
 Marcus Lantz (Jan 1, 2020– Dec 31, 2020)
 Christian Järdler (Jan 1, 2021– Aug 3, 2021)
 Anders Torstensson (Aug 4, 2021– Dec 31, 2021)
 Andreas Brännström (Jan 1, 2022– Dec 31, 2022)
 Anders Torstensson (Jan 1, 2023– Present)

Achievements

League
 Superettan:
 Winners (2): 2009, 2019
 Division 1 Södra:
 Winners (1): 2018
 Runners-up (1): 1988

Footnotes

References

External links

 Mjällby AIF – official site
 Sillastrybarna – official supporter club site
 Mjällby AIF at svenskafans.com – supporter site

 
Football clubs in Blekinge County
Allsvenskan clubs
Blekinge County
Association football clubs established in 1939
1939 establishments in Sweden